Uncial 0207 (in the Gregory-Aland numbering), is a Greek uncial manuscript of the New Testament, dated paleographically to the 4th-century.

Description 
The codex contains a small parts of the Book of Revelation 9:2-15, on one parchment leaf (19 cm by 15 cm). The text is written in two columns per page, 29 lines per page, in a small uncial letters.
The leaf is paginated (no 478).

The text-type of this codex is a representative of the Alexandrian text-type with numerous alien readings. Aland placed it in Category III. 

Currently it is dated by the INTF to the 4th century.

The manuscript was added to the list of the New Testament manuscripts by Ernst von Dobschütz in 1933.

The manuscript was found in Egypt. Mario Naldini published its facsimile. 

The codex currently is housed at the Laurentian Library (PSI 1166) in Florence.

See also 

 List of New Testament uncials
 Textual criticism

References

Further reading 

 M.-J. Lagrange, Critique textuelle II, La Critique rationelle (Paris, 1915), pp. 585-586.
 J. Schmid, Der Apokalypsetext des Kodex 0207 (Papiri della Societa Italiana 1166), BZ 23 (1935/1936), pp. 187-189.
 G. Vitelli and G. Mercati, Publicazioni della Societa Italiana 10, pp. 112-120.

External links 
 GA 0207 at the CSNTM
 PSI 1166 BML
 PSI X 1166 Papiri Leterari della Biblioteca Laurenziana

4th-century biblical manuscripts
Uncial 0207